The Prelude and Fugue in C minor, BWV 871, is a keyboard composition by Johann Sebastian Bach. It is the second prelude and fugue in the second book of The Well-Tempered Clavier, a series of 48 preludes and fugues by the composer. It was composed in 1738.

Prelude 
The prelude is not heavily ornamented, but it does contain a few trills. The piece is mainly made up of sixteenth notes and eighth notes and a few quarter notes and half notes.

Fugue 
It consists of half notes, quarter notes, dotted eighth notes, eighth notes, sixteenth notes, and some 32nd notes. The fugue is not heavily ornamented, and it ends in a Picardy third.

References 

Fugues by Johann Sebastian Bach
Compositions in C minor
1738 compositions